The dwarf fat-tailed mouse opossum (Thylamys velutinus), also known as the velvety fat-tailed opossum is an opossum species from South America. It is endemic to Brazil, where it is found in cerrado and caatinga habitats. Its head-and-body length is about 141-212 (average 173.3) mm, and its tail length is about 73-85 (average 78) mm. Its diet is 44% arthropods; 75% of its diet consists of animals and animal products. Its ventral fur is entirely gray-based. Its hind foot is less than 14 mm, which is short for the genus.

References

External links
Infonatura Species Page

Opossums
Marsupials of South America
Mammals of Brazil
Endemic fauna of Brazil
Mammals described in 1842